Prem Man Chitrakar (1944–2020) was a veteran Nepalese Paubha artist, poet and writer. He has completed his Intermediate level of studies in Humanities. He has participated in several group shows and has own Newari publication including Prarampara Chojya Bidhi and Nepal Bhasaya Mecha Dapa Khala Jhigu Sa. He was former Chairman of Nepal Paramparagat Kalakar Sangha, Founder Advisor of Artist's Society and also worked as a Sikka Designer in Nepal Rastra Bank.

Biography
Chitrakar was born on 9 December 1944 at Bhimsensthan, in Newar community of the Kathmandu Valley in Nepal.

Awards
 2016 (2072 B.S.): Arniko National Fine Arts Academic Honor
 1995 (2051 B.S.): Indra Rajyalaxmi Pragya Puraskar
 2000 (2056 B.S.): Narottam Das Indira Shrestha Guthi Shrestha Puraskar

References

1944 births
2020 deaths
Newar-language writers
Newar people
People from Kathmandu
Nepalese poets
Nepalese artists